Jonas Björkman and David Prinosil were the defending champions but only Prinosil competed that year with Martin Damm.

Damm and Prinosil lost in the quarterfinals to Donald Johnson and Jared Palmer.

Max Mirnyi and Sandon Stolle won in the final 6–3, 6–0 against Mahesh Bhupathi and Jeff Tarango.

Seeds

Draw

External links
 2001 Kremlin Cup Men's Doubles Draw

Kremlin Cup
Kremlin Cup